Vignan Institute of Technology and Aeronautical Engineering(VITAE) is one of the Engineering Colleges that is located in Vignan Hills, Deshmukhi, Nalgonda, Telangana, India. It is 25 km away from Hyderabad. The college is affiliated with Jawaharlal Nehru Technological University, Hyderabad (JNTUH). The campus was established in an area named Vignan Hills. Vignan Hills has an area of 350 acres (1.4 km2) with valleys and watersheds, with mango groves and greenery around. It is situated at a distance of 35 km from Koti, Hyderabad. The college provides various amenities such laboratories and computer centers in its college blocks. Vignan also provides a library and an information center and a sport center for indoor and outdoor games.

History 
Vignan is the brainchild of Dr. L. Rathaiah. Dr. Rathaiah developed a series of educational materials for public and competitive examinations and later established the Vignan Residential Institutions in 1983.

Intake
VITAE was established in 2008, with intake of 240 students for undergraduate courses. In 2016, VITA has expanded to accommodate 1200 students. The breakdown of available seats are:

External links 
 www.vignanitae.ac.in

Engineering colleges in Telangana
Educational institutions established in 2008
2008 establishments in Andhra Pradesh